The hairy localisation element (HLE) is an RNA element found in the 3' UTR of the hairy gene. HLE contains two stem-loops. HLE is essential for the mediation of apical localisation and the two stem-loop structures act to allow the recognition of hairy mRNA by the localisation machinery. HLE is found in Drosophila species.

References

External links 
 

Cis-regulatory RNA elements